Teunom River is a river in northern Sumatra, in the province of Aceh, Indonesia, about 1700 km northeast of the capital Jakarta.

Geography 
The river flows along the northern area of Sumatra with predominantly tropical rainforest climate (designated as Af in the Köppen-Geiger climate classification). The annual average temperature in the area is 23 °C. The warmest month is February, when the average temperature is around 26 °C, and the coldest is January, at 22 °C. The average annual rainfall is 4059 mm. The wettest month is November, with an average of 536 mm rainfall, and the driest is July, with 205 mm rainfall.

See also
List of rivers of Aceh
List of rivers of Indonesia
List of rivers of Sumatra

References

Rivers of Aceh
Rivers of Indonesia